Lesley Webber is a fictional character from General Hospital, an American soap opera on the ABC network. Actress Denise Alexander played the role from 1973 through February 28, 1984, as a series regular, and from 1996 to 2009 in a recurring status. Alexander returned to the series briefly in 2013 to celebrate its 50th anniversary, and has made subsequent appearances in 2017, 2019, and 2021.

Casting
Actress Denise Alexander started playing the role of Dr. Lesley Webber in March 1973. In 1976, although TIME magazine panned General Hospital at the time, Alexander's character Lesley was noted as the serial's saving grace. When Alexander and the network could not agree to contractual negotiations, the character was axed in March 1984. Angry fans picketed the studio because they were upset that Webber died off the show. In 1996, the series wrote the character back in, and Alexander appeared in a recurring status until October 2009. In 2013, Alexander returned to the role from May 16 to December 13. In November 2017, it was announced she would reprise her role, returning for a one-off visit on December 22.

In March 2019, Entertainment Weekly announced that Alexander would again return as Lesley, in celebration of the serial's 56th anniversary. She made her appearance during the April 2 episode. In January 2021, it was announced she would once again return as Lesley.  She returned for episodes from January 8 through February 26.

Storylines

1973–84
Lesley came to Port Charles in March 1973 and immediately joined the staff at General Hospital. Florence Gray became one of Lesley's first patients. Florence was suffering from stomach ulcers, which she thought were caused by her troubled marriage with Gordon Gray. She started seeing psychiatrist Peter Taylor. Florence told Peter about her husband's affair with one of her students years earlier and how he had gotten her pregnant but unfortunately the child died at birth. Peter told Lesley about Florence's history and was shocked to find out that she was that very student who had the affair with Gordon. He re-entered Lesley's life and confessed his love to her. Gordon was about to leave Florence and start a new life with Lesley. She asked Dr. Steve Hardy to be taken off the case. Lesley convinced Gordon to stay with his wife. She was then tormented by the memories of giving birth, and losing her daughter.

Shortly after Lesley married Cameron Faulkner, she found out that the daughter who she thought had died was only living miles away from her. Lesley did a little research and found out that her daughter Laura was adopted by Jason and Barbara Vining. Lesley was desperate to see her daughter again, but Cameron ordered her to stay away from Laura and never make contact with her. Lesley started meeting Laura anyway. Barbara and Jason got curious about Laura's new friendship and soon realized that Lesley had to be Laura's biological mother. As Laura found out the truth, she was thrilled. Lesley was later granted full custody of Laura. When Laura fell ill and Peter told her that the illness was emotion-based, Lesley decided to return Laura to the Vinings. Cameron was thrilled about that development. Lesley couldn't get over losing Laura again. Cameron started an affair with his secretary Peggy and was determined to get Laura out of Lesley's life for good. He first paid an elderly nurse to convince Lesley that Laura wasn't even her daughter. As this didn't work, Cameron paid the Vinings a lot of money to move away with Laura. When Lesley found out about Cameron's scheme to keep her from her daughter, he kidnapped Lesley. As Cameron was driving, Lesley grabbed the steering wheel and the car lunged off the road, killing Cameron.

Lesley's colleague Rick Webber started comforting Lesley. As Rick tried to stay away from his brother's wife Monica, he spent more time with Lesley and helped her over the miscarriage of her late husband's baby. Monica became jealous over Rick's friendship with Lesley. Monica confronted Lesley, told her to stay away from Rick and that they were having an affair. Rick and Lesley got closer anyway and Rick helped Lesley find Laura. Lesley was left crushed when Laura wanted to have nothing to do with her anymore. Rick eventually got through to Laura, telling her how much Lesley loved her and that she never gave up on her. Lesley was grateful to Rick and filled with joy when he confessed his love for her and proposed. Lesley and Rick were eventually married.

A man by the name of David Hamilton was admitted to General Hospital and turned out to be an old college friend of Rick's. David's wife and children were killed, while David was left paralyzed. The doctors couldn't find out why David was unable to walk and he was released. He accepted Rick's offer to stay with him and Lesley to recuperate. While Lesley thought something was strange about David, Laura cared for him. Soon David got his own apartment and tried to make a pass at Lesley who rejected him. Lesley confessed to Rick's brother Jeff about what happened with David. Jeff swore he wouldn't tell Rick. David moved on to Laura after Lesley rejected him and started a secret romantic relationship with the young girl. David was only using Laura to get to Lesley. When David told Laura the truth, that he was really in love with Lesley, Laura pushed David, who fell to his death. Lesley later discovered David's body. In an effort to protect Laura, Lesley decided to confess to murdering David. Laura felt guilty and ran away. She eventually returned and confessed to the murder. The charges against Lesley were dropped and Laura was sentenced to six months' probation.

Lesley and Rick's marriage became troubled when Lesley started to think that Rick and Monica were having another affair. As General Hospital was put under quarantine, Monica and Rick were among the doctors working at the hospital. After everyone was free from the quarantine, Monica and Rick slept together. While Monica was sure of her feelings for Rick, he told her that they would need time to figure things out. Laura's car accident led Rick to rethink his involvement with Monica and he told her that they were over for good. Monica reconciled with her husband, Alan Quartermaine, as she discovered that she was pregnant. In the meantime, Lesley and Rick started to think about a baby of their own. Sadly, Lesley was unable to conceive as it would put her life in danger.

Laura's adopted sister Amy Vining moved to Port Charles around this time to become a nurse, and Rick and Lesley welcomed her into their home, often amused by her tendency for gossip, but sometimes overwhelmed by it. Lesley ended up delivering Monica's baby. As Monica feared that she wouldn't survive, she told Lesley that the baby was Rick's. Lesley and Rick separated after he tried to tell her about his affair with Monica, and Lesley told him that she already was aware. Rick found out that Alan Jr. could be his son and filed a suit against Monica. Lesley, still in love with Rick, supported him and even agreed to a divorce so that he could claim his son. It was later discovered that Alan Jr. was in fact Alan's son and not Rick's. During this time, Lesley allowed her former sister-in-law Heather to stay with her when Heather was released from a mental institution after having accidentally taken an overdose of L.S.D. several years before. Lesley was supportive of Heather's mother, Alice Grant, when it was revealed that she had shot Lesley's hospital co-worker Diana Taylor in an effort to keep Diana from killing Heather.

Lesley and Rick remarried and adopted a six-year-old boy named Mike. As Laura disappeared and was presumed dead, Lesley was crushed and had a hard time dealing with the fact that her daughter was dead. Lesley and Rick eventually became foster parents to Blackie Parrish after his mother died. With three young wards living in their home, the Webber residence was never quiet. When Blackie entered the music business, Rick noticed a change in Blackie's personality. He became arrogant and shallow. Blackie ended up accidentally killing his girlfriend Lou. He was arrested and sentenced to time in prison.

An old enemy of Rick's, D. L. Brock, came to town. He wanted revenge on Rick for closing his cannery when Rick was part of the Port Charles Health Commission. Brock brought Ginny Blake to town, who was claiming to be Mike's biological mother. Bobbie Spencer, Brock's wife, figured out that Ginny might be in on the revenge against Rick and warned Lesley. She confronted Ginny and then Lesley ended up in a car accident and was killed.

1996–2005

It was revealed that Lesley was in fact alive in 1996. Stefan Cassadine, son of Mikkos and brother of Stavros who had kidnapped Laura years ago, was keeping Lesley drugged in a catatonic state. Lesley and Laura were reunited and, with Luke's help, they faked their deaths to escape the Cassadines. When they returned months later, their friends and family turned against them out of hurt. Stefan blackmailed Laura into leaving town once more. She lied to Luke that her mother needed treatment in Switzerland and took Lulu with them. In 1998, they returned and Lesley took over being a mother to Laura and grandmother to Laura's sons Nikolas and Lucky and daughter Lesley Lu.

In 2002, a now divorced Rick Webber returned to give his daughter Laura away again at her second wedding to Luke Spencer. Rick was happy to see Lesley alive and well again but his flirtations with old flame Monica upset Lesley and made Monica's husband, Alan, extremely jealous. His return made Laura remember some terrible events. She began having flashbacks involving the garage attic, including wearing a dress covered in blood. Rick and Scott Baldwin could tell that Laura was remembering and tried to prevent the truth from coming out. Years ago Rick was having an affair with nurse Theresa Carter and Laura walked in on them in the attic. Theresa had gotten violent and Laura took an antique camera and hit Theresa over the head with it. It killed her and Rick and Scott buried her in the back yard. Rick then gave Laura a certain drug for her to forget that night. When Rick encountered Laura in the Webber attic, she freaked out and presumably hit him over the head which caused his death. The horror of the events caused Laura to slip into a mental state of catatonia which caused much grief for Luke, Lesley, and in her last appearance, Amy. Lesley not only had to deal with the loss of the love of her life but the prospect of losing her daughter whom she had struggled hard years before to find and reconnect with.

2006–09
In October 2006, Luke gave Robin Scorpio, now a doctor, his permission to give Laura an experimental drug called LS-49 that would temporarily bring her out of her catatonic state. The drug worked and everyone in Laura's life were overjoyed to have her back for the 3 weeks. In that time. Laura made Luke take her back to the Scorpio attic so she could remember what happened between her and Rick Webber the night she killed her stepfather four years ago; she painfully, tearfully did remember. Lesley, along with Laura's children, the Quartermaines, and the rest of LnL's loved ones were in attendance at Luke and Laura got remarried like they were going to do before Laura had her breakdown. The lavish ceremony took place in Lila's rose garden per Laura's wishes. The marriage was fake however as Luke was married to Tracy Quartermaine at the time. The minister who performed the ceremony was only an actor who Luke had hired to perform it. He only went along with it because it meant so much to Laura and he wanted to make what time she had left as meaningful and memorable as possible. Lesley and the rest were devastated when Laura slowly but finally slipped back into her catatonic state. Before her goodbye with Lulu, Laura told her daughter that she didn't believe that she had actually killed Rick Webber, but not to tell Luke this because it would break his heart. (Luke telling Laura that she killed her stepfather is what actually pushed her to really have her breakdown and into her catatonic state) Lulu vowed to pursue the matter and find Rick's real killer.

After Alan died from a heart attack during the Metro Court Hotel hostage crisis during February sweeps, Lulu and her stepbrother Dillon Quartermaine intercepted a letter addressed to Luke which was to be delivered to him after Alan's death. In the letter, it says that Scott Baldwin is actually the one who killed Rick that night. When Lulu confronts a recently returned to town during the hostage crisis Scott about the letter, he eventually confirms it. He went to the Scorpio house that night to check on Laura and upon hearing her scream found her in the attic fighting with Rick. He was the one who hit him on the head with the candlestick, unintentionally killing him, to stop him from giving Laura the drug. He left just before Luke arrived on the scene and came to the only possible conclusion that he could think of: in an altercation, with Laura's current state of mind, she thought Rick was trying to hurt her so she hit him with the now bloody candlestick and accidentally killed him. Telling her this is what sent her into her catatonic state. Lulu decided that she could never tell her father what she has learned because it would destroy him; he would either a) kill Scott Baldwin for his part and be sent to jail for murder and she would never see him again or b) he would want to kill Scott and he would feel so guilty and heartbroken that he was the one who caused Laura's catatonia telling her something so traumatic when it didn't even happen.

Lesley attended Lucky and Elizabeth's second marriage in March, where she was also introduced to Spinelli when he interrupted the ceremony when the minister asked "if anyone knew why they should not be joined . . ." Spinelli only stood up because it looked like Lulu was about to tell everyone that Elizabeth's baby was really Jason's and not Lucky's. Spinelli recovered and the marriage took place.

Lesley returned to the front-burner temporarily on October 30, 2008 when Scott kidnapped Laura and took her to Los Angeles. She assisted Lucky, Lulu, and Nikolas in finding her location. Laura is eventually found and is leaving Port Charles for Paris to seek further treatment. Not known to anyone at first, Laura is followed by Scott.

Lesley attended Lucky and Elizabeth's engagement party in October 2009 and then disappeared off-screen. She stayed for a while with Laura in Paris, where she became aware that her daughter and Scott got closer again. Not liking Laura and Scott's newfound friendship, Lesley joins Nikolas at Lake Como in Italy.

2013
As of March 2013, Lesley is said to be staying at Nikolas' house in Italy and is taking care of his son Spencer. A couple of weeks later, Lesley returns to Port Charles with Spencer to reunite him with his father. She is surprised to learn of Laura's plans to remarry Scott. Lesley disapproves of Laura's plans and confronts Scott with the murder of her husband, Rick Webber. Laura pleads with Lesley and hopes that she forgive Scott's past mistakes. Scott promises Lesley that he cares for Laura and wants only what's best for her. Not wanting to stay in their way, Lesley gives them her blessing even though she's not happy about it. After Mayor Lomax is unable to perform Laura and Scott's wedding, Lesley jumps in as she's able to officiate the ceremony. At the wedding, Lesley also reunites with her granddaughter Lulu who was recently kidnapped by Stavros Cassadine and since then can't remember her previous life. Lesley becomes aware of Nikolas' interest in Elizabeth, who's attending the ceremony with Monica's son AJ.  Later on, Lesley put on a doctor's jacket for the first time in almost 30 years when she pretended to still be a doctor in order to gain information on Luke's medical condition, but ended up being confronted by old rival Monica. After exchanging barbs, Monica allowed Lesley to get the information she was seeking when Lesley pleaded to Monica's motherly instincts. After coming back from escorting Laura to France, Lesley decided to remain in town. On Halloween night, Lesley passed out when she opened the Wyndemere door to find Faison standing there. Later on, old rival Monica was invited over for an off-screen visit with Lesley which included old hospital pals Gail Baldwin and Audrey Hardy where Lesley gave Monica a gift of a painting which unbeknownst to them was painted by Heather!

2017
Lesley returns in 2017 for Laura's wedding to Kevin Collins, and ends up officiating the ceremony.

References

General Hospital characters
Television characters introduced in 1973
Fictional physicians
Fictional female doctors
Fictional characters incorrectly presumed dead